The Answer or variation, may refer to:

Arts and entertainment

Music
The Answer (band), a rock band from Northern Ireland

Albums
 The Answer (album), a 1997 album by Gloria Gaynor
 The Answer, a 2010 EP, or its title track, by Unkle
 The Answers, an album by Blue October

Songs
"The Answer", by Audio Adrenaline from the album Kings & Queens
"The Answer", by Bad Religion from the album Generator
"The Answer", by Bloc Party from the album Bloc Party
"The Answer", by Blue October from the album The Answers
"The Answer", by Britney Spears from the album In the Zone
"The Answer", by Candlebox from the album Into the Sun
"The Answer", by Myka Relocate from the album Lies to Light the Way
"The Answer", by Richie Sambora from the album Stranger in This Town
"The Answer", by Savages from the album Adore Life

Literature
The Answer or Answer (comics), a fictional character in Marvel Comics
The Answer (novel), a book in the Animorphs series
"The Answer" (short story), a 1959 science fiction short story by H. Beam Piper
The Questionnaire (Salomon novel), also published as "The Answers"

Other media
"The Answer" (Steven Universe), an episode from the American animated television series
The Answer (film), 1916 British short film
"The Answer" (The Good Place), an episode from the American comedy television series

Other uses
 Nickname of Allen Iverson, American basketball player
The Answer, a 1929 Paramount Cabinaire plane used for a non-stop endurance record attempt

See also

Answer (disambiguation)
Die Antwoord (Afrikaans for "The Answer"), a South African hip hop group